Nikephoros Palaiologos (died 18 October 1081) was a Byzantine general of the 11th century.

Biography
Nikephoros is the first known member of the Palaiologos family, which would eventually rise to become the last ruling dynasty of the Byzantine Empire from 1259 to 1453. He had two sons, George and Nicholas. George Palaiologos also became a general and was one of the chief supporters of Emperor Alexios I Komnenos (r. 1081–1118). Through George and his great-great-grandson Andronikos Palaiologos, the later Palaiologan dynasty draws its descent.

Nikephoros is first attested during the short reign of Romanos IV Diogenes (r. 1068–1071). A Doukas partisan, he was hostile to Romanos and a member of the opposition around the Caesar John Doukas and Michael Psellos. After the fall of Romanos following the disastrous Battle of Manzikert (1071), Nikephoros was dispatched east against the Norman mercenary Roussel de Bailleul, who had rebelled against imperial rule. After gathering some 6,000 mercenaries in Georgia, he confronted Roussel, but his Georgian troops defected and he was defeated. In 1077, he is recorded as doux of Mesopotamia. Although loyal to the Doukas dynasty and Emperor Michael VII Doukas (r. 1071–1078), he did permit his son George to join the rebellion of Nikephoros Botaneiates, who became emperor as Nikephoros III (r. 1078–1081). 

In 1081, he again remained loyal to Botaneiates when the Komnenoi under Alexios Komnenos rose up, even though his son George and the Doukai supported the Komnenian cause. According to Anna Komnene's Alexiad, father and son even met during the Komnenian forces' entry into Constantinople on 1 April 1081, in what Basile Skoulatos describes as one of the "most passionate" scenes of the work. Even then, Nikephoros tried to induce Botaneiates to resist, urging him to give him command of the Varangian Guard and try to defend the imperial palace, but in vain. He then tried to mediate and proposed that Alexios be adopted by Botaneiates and assume de facto control over the Empire, while the latter would retain the honorary position of emperor, but at the insistence of Caesar John Doukas, the Komnenoi rejected this proposal. Eventually, Botaneiates abdicated.

Nikephoros accepted Alexios as his new emperor, and accompanied him in his campaign in the same year against the Normans under Robert Guiscard. He fought and died at the Battle of Dyrrhachium against Guiscard's forces on 18 October 1081.

References

Sources
 
 

11th-century births
1081 deaths
Year of birth unknown
11th-century Byzantine military personnel
Byzantine generals
Byzantines killed in battle
Nikephoros
Generals of Alexios I Komnenos
Byzantine people of the Byzantine–Norman wars